Justin Beck is an American musician and businessman. He is the guitarist and musical writer for Long Island, New York band Glassjaw. Beck, with a high school and college buddy, Lee Tepper, also co-founded a band merchandise company called MerchDirect, which started in 1999 after Beck refused to give up the rights to his merchandising to a major label. In the 90s, he was a member of the straight edge hardcore band Sons of Abraham, together with Todd Weinstock.

Personal life
He and wife, Melissa Howard, an alumna of The Real World: New Orleans, are the parents of Shalom Mazie, who was born March 20, 2009,  and two other daughters: Maja and Shira.

Justin Beck is the only member of Glassjaw to remain straight edge.

References

External links
Justin Beck - Off The Record article

Living people
People from Long Island
People from Merrick, New York
1979 births
Businesspeople from New York (state)
Glassjaw members